Oh My Ghost is a 2022 Indian Tamil-language horror comedy film directed by R. Yuvan and starring Sathish, Sunny Leone and Dharsha Gupta in the lead roles. It was released on 30 December 2022.

Cast

Sathish as A. Bharathi
Sunny Leone as Mayasena
Ramesh Thilak
Yogi Babu
Dharsha Gupta
Arjunan as Pushpa
KPY Thangadurai
Rajendran
Ravi Mariya
Kalki
Supergood Subramani
GP Muthu

Production
Production for the film began in mid-2021, with a 20-day schedule in Chennai and a further 20=day schedule in Mumbai held. The shoot of the film was completed by December 2021.

During the film's audio release event, Sathish's comments on the attire of his co-host Dharsha Gupta received criticism, after he had compared her glamorous outfit of that to a more conservative outfit worn by Sunny Leone. Sathish later tried to imply that Dharsha had asked him to make a comment, which the actress denied, prompting Sathish to take back his second statement.

Reception
The film was released on 30 December 2022 across Tamil Nadu.A critic from The Times of India noted the film was "neither frightening nor amusing", adding "we are forced to sit through it with a flat-face as none of the scenes invoke any kind of emotion". A reviewer from Cinema Express wrote the film was "packed to the brim with bad writing and bland acting".

References

External links

2022 films
2022 horror films
Indian comedy horror films
2020s Tamil-language films